
Mattmark dam is a reservoir in the Saas Valley of the Canton of Valais, Switzerland. The Mattmark dam was built from 1960 to 1965.

The lake lies at a height of 2,197 metres above sea level, between the massifs of the Rimpfischhorn and Stellihorn. The highest peak visible from the lake is the Strahlhorn (4,190 m).

Mattmark disaster 
On August 30, 1965, 88 construction workers, 56 of them of Italian nationality, were buried under 2,000,000 m³ of ice and debris by a glacier collapse of the Allalin glacier. The risk involved in constructing the accommodation barracks directly below the glacier tongue, which eventually broke off, was not taken into account. No other reservoir in Switzerland claimed so many victims during construction. Seven years after the accident, the Valais judiciary acquitted all 17 defendants, including engineers and managers of Elektrowatt and officials of the Swiss Accident Insurance Fund. In 2005, journalist Kurt Marti revealed that those responsible for the construction site knew about the dangers of the Allalin glacier and that the court ignored all incriminating facts in its decision.

See also
List of lakes of Switzerland
List of mountain lakes of Switzerland

References

External links
Kraftwerke Mattmark 
Images

Lakes of Valais
Reservoirs in Switzerland